The Fiji shrikebill (Clytorhynchus vitiensis) is a songbird species in the family Monarchidae. It is found in American Samoa, Fiji, and Tonga. Its natural habitat is subtropical or tropical moist lowland forests.

Taxonomy and systematics
The Fiji shrikebill was originally described as belonging to the genus Myiolestes. Alternate names include the lesser shrikebill and uniform shrikebill.

Subspecies
Twelve subspecies are recognized:
 Rotuman lesser shrikebill (C. v. wiglesworthi) - Mayr, 1933: Found on Rotuma Island (northern Fiji)
 C. v. brunneus - (Ramsay, EP, 1875): Found on Kadavu, Ono and Vanua Kula (south-western Fiji)
 C. v. buensis - (Layard, EL, 1876): Originally described as a separate species in the genus Myiolestes. Found on Vana Levu and Kioa (northern Fiji)
 C. v. vitiensis - (Hartlaub, 1866): Found in western Fiji
 C. v. layardi - Mayr, 1933: Found on Taveuni (central Fiji)
 C. v. pontifex - Mayr, 1933: Found on Qamea and Rabi (northern Fiji)
 Vanuatu lesser shrikebill (C. v. vatuanus) - Mayr, 1933: Found on northern Lau Islands (eastern Fiji)
 C. v. nesiotes - (Wetmore, 1919): Originally described as a separate species. Found on southern Lau Islands (eastern Fiji)
 Futuna lesser shrikebill (C. v. fortunae) - (Layard, EL, 1876): Originally described as a separate species in the genus Myiolestes. Found on Futuna and Alofi (north-east of Fiji)
 C. v. heinei - (Finsch & Hartlaub, 1870): Originally described as a separate species in the genus Myiolestes. Found on central Tonga Islands
 C. v. keppeli - Mayr, 1933: Found on Niuatoputapu and Tafahi (northern Tonga)
 Manu’a shrikebill (C. v. powelli) - (Salvin, 1879): Originally described as a separate species. Found on Samoa but may have gone extinct in the 1990s due to habitat destruction

References

Clytorhynchus
Birds of Fiji
Birds described in 1866
Taxonomy articles created by Polbot
Taxa named by Gustav Hartlaub